Michel Bourez (born 30 December 1985) is a French professional surfer.

Biography 
Bourez was born on the island of Rurutu in the Tuamotus Islands in French Polynesia and started surfing at age 13. European champion in 2006, Michel entered the ASP World Tour in 2009.

His best results on the World Tour came in 2014, with a fifth place in the overall classification, having won twice during the year; at Margaret River Pro 2014 and Rio de Janeiro and third place in Fiji Pro.

His 2015 season was hampered by a severe injury in May, when doing a free surf session at Teahupoo. A fractured hand and cervical vertebra forced him out of the Rio and Fiji events.

In 2016, he earned his third career victory at the Billabong Pipeline Masters, final event of the 2016 World Tour, finishing sixth overall.

He qualified to represent France at the debut of surfing at the 2020 Summer Olympics.

Career and Results 
 2014:
 Winner of Margaret River Pro 2014 at Margaret River (Australia).
 Winner of Billabong Rio Pro in Rio de Janeiro (Brasil).
 2016:
 Winner of Billabong Pipe Masters at Banzai Pipeline on the North Shore in Oahu (Hawaï)''.

See also
ASP World Tour

References

1985 births
French surfers
World Surf League surfers
Living people
Olympic surfers of France
People from Tahiti
Surfers at the 2020 Summer Olympics